William S. Edsall House is a historic home located at Fort Wayne, Indiana. It was built in 1839–1840, and is a two-story, five bay, transitional Federal / Greek Revival style brick dwelling. It measures 44 feet wide and 20 feet deep, sits on a raised basement, and has four interior end chimneys.

It was listed on the National Register of Historic Places in 1976.

References

Houses on the National Register of Historic Places in Indiana
Houses completed in 1840
Federal architecture in Indiana
Greek Revival houses in Indiana
National Register of Historic Places in Fort Wayne, Indiana
Houses in Fort Wayne, Indiana